The Gesnerioideae are a subfamily of plants in the family Gesneriaceae: based on the type genus Gesneria. Although genera typically originate in the New World, some species have become widely distributed as ornamental plants.

Description
Gesnerioideae is one of two main subfamilies in the Gesneriaceae, the other being Didymocarpoideae. (The third subfamily, Sanangoideae, contains only the genus Sanango.) Gesnerioideae seedlings have normal cotyledons of the same size and shape (isocotylous), whereas the cotyledons of Didymocarpoideae are usually, but not always, eventually different in size and shape (anisocotylous). Gesnerioideae flowers usually have four fertile stamens, rarely two or five. In other respects, Gesnerioideae species are very variable. The ovary may be superior, semi-inferior or inferior, and the fruit takes various forms.

Taxonomy
The original use of the name for the subfamily is attributed to Gilbert Thomas Burnett in 1835. Burnett divided his circumscription of the family Gesneriaceae into "Besleridae" and "Gesneridae". The latter was distinguished by having an inferior or semi-inferior ovary and the calyx adhering to the gynoecium ("germen"). However, Burnett's circumscription of the family and subfamilies was very different to the modern conception. He placed the "Didymocarpidae" (a name which corresponds to the modern Didymocarpoideae), not in Gesneriaceae, but in Acanthaceae. Since about 1997, phylogenetic studies, mostly based on molecular approaches, have resulted in major changes to the traditional taxonomy and classification of the family Gesneriaceae, at every level from genus upwards.

Tribes and genera
A classification published in 2020 divides the subfamily into five tribes.
 Tribe Titanotricheae

 Titanotrichum

 Tribe Napeantheae

 Napeanthus

 Tribe Beslerieae

 Anetanthus
 Besleria
 Cremosperma
 Cremospermopsis
 Gasteranthus
 Reldia
 Resia
 Shuaria
 Tylopsacas

 Tribe Coronanthereae

 Asteranthera
 Coronanthera
 Depanthus
 Fieldia, including Lenbrassia
 Mitraria
 Negria
 Rhabdothamnus
 Sarmienta

 Tribe Gesnerieae

 Achimenes
 Alloplectus
 Alsobia
 Amalophyllon
 Bellonia
 Centrosolenia
 Chautemsia
 Christopheria
 Chrysothemis
 Cobananthus
 Codonanthe
 Codonanthopsis
 Columnea
 Corytoplectus
 Crantzia
 Cremersia
 Diastema
 Drymonia
 Episcia
 Eucodonia
 Gesneria
 Glossoloma
 Gloxinella
 Gloxinia
 Gloxiniopsis
 Goyazia
 Heppiella
 Kohleria
 Lampadaria
 Lembocarpus
 Lesia
 Mandirola
 Monopyle
 Moussonia
 Nautilocalyx
 Nematanthus
 Neomortonia
 Niphaea
 Nomopyle
 Oerstedina
 Pachycaulos
 Pagothyra
 Paliavana
 Paradrymonia
 Pearcea
 Pheidonocarpa
 Phinaea
 Rhoogeton
 Rhytidophyllum
 Rufodorsia
 Seemannia
 Sinningia
 Smithiantha
 Solenophora
 Sphaerorrhiza
 Trichodrymonia
 Vanhouttea

Distribution
With the exception of the genus Titanotrichum, which is native to eastern Asia, all the species of the subfamily Gesnerioideae are native from Central and South America through the southwest Pacific to Australia.

References

External links
 
 

Flora of South America
Gesnerioideae
Plant subfamilies